The Bishop of the Northern Territory is the diocesan bishop of the Anglican Diocese of the Northern Territory, Australia.

List of Bishops of the Northern Territory
References

External links

 – official site

 
Lists of Anglican bishops and archbishops
Anglican bishops of the Northern Territory